Stephen Christopher Wearne (born 16 December 2000) is an English professional footballer who plays as an attacking midfielder for EFL League Two side Grimsby Town.

Playing career

Early career
A youth product of Newcastle United and Middlesbrough, he signed his first professional contact with Middlesbrough on 15 April 2019.

Sunderland
He transferred to Sunderland on 9 September 2020. He made his professional debut with Sunderland in a 2–1 EFL Trophy win over Lincoln City on 5 October 2021, scoring the game winning goal in the 72nd minute.

On 7 January 2022, Wearne joined National League side Torquay United on loan for the remainder of the 2021–22 season.
He returned to Sunderland, and was later released following the clubs promotion to the EFL Championship.

Grimsby Town
On 27 June 2022, Wearne signed for EFL League Two side Grimsby Town on a one-year deal. Upon signing, Wearne said he was convinced to sign for Grimsby when he was on holiday in Cancun, Mexico with his girlfriend. "Other managers were pressuring me to make a decision. I said to her - I need a sign. I went to bed that night, next morning, I came out of the lift and the first guy I see has a Grimsby top on. And I just said, 'That's the sign'. It's done".

On 9 August, Wearne scored his first goal for The Mariners in a 4-0 win over Crewe Alexandra in the EFL Cup first round.

On 1 November 2022, Wearne returned to National League side Torquay United on a one-month loan. Wearne played his first game back later that day and assisted the fourth goal in a 6-1 win over Aldershot Town. His loan was extended for a further month on 2 December 2022.

References

External links
 

2000 births
Living people
Footballers from Stockton-on-Tees
English footballers
Sunderland A.F.C. players
Middlesbrough F.C. players
Torquay United F.C. players
Grimsby Town F.C. players
English Football League players
National League (English football) players
Association football midfielders